Acestrorhynchus maculipinna is a species of fish in the family Acestrorhynchidae. It was described by Naércio Aquino de Menezes and Jacques Géry in 1983. It inhabits the Amazon River.

A. maculipinna is currently ranked as Least Concern by the IUCN redlist, owing to postulation that the species is not at great risk of being threatened, due to a lack of fishing in large areas of its region, and the apparent robust health of its environment.

References

Acestrorhynchidae
Taxa named by Naércio Aquino de Menezes
Taxa named by Jacques Géry
Fish described in 1983